The Society for Music Theory (SMT) is an American organization devoted to the promotion of music theory as a scholarly and pedagogical discipline. It currently has a membership of over 1200, primarily in the United States.

In the 1970s, few schools had dedicated music theory programs, many music theorists had been trained as composers or historians, and there was a belief among theorists that the teaching of music theory was inadequate and that the subject was not properly recognised as a scholarly discipline in its own right. A growing number of scholars began promoting the idea that music theory should be taught by theorists, rather than composers, performers or music historians. In the words of Richmond Browne, a founding member of the Society and its first secretary, "Our goal was to create a profession." After a number of more informal discussions, there were two National Conferences on Music Theory, the first in 1976 in Boston and the second on 19 October 1977 at Northwestern University in Evanston, Illinois. While organizers were wary about collecting enough momentum, three hundred scholars turned up for the Evanston meeting, and the society was founded with an initial membership including almost 500 theorists. The name of the new organization was suggested by Maury Yeston, then of the Yale faculty, in the form of a motion that was passed unanimously.

The first President of the Society was Allen Forte, whose work developing set theory for the analysis of atonal music made him a leading voice in music scholarship at the time. The first official annual meeting of the society was in 1978 in Minneapolis. A year later, in 1979, the Society published the first issue of Music Theory Spectrum, the official journal of the Society and now a leading publication in the field of music theory. In 1993, the Society began experimenting with online publishing, and in 1995 the first volume of Music Theory Online was published. Music Theory Spectrum is a print journal distributed to subscribers, whereas Music Theory Online is free and published on the Society's website. Both journals are peer-reviewed, and regularly feature the work of prominent scholars in the field.

Since its foundation, the society has had a significant impact in many other countries, contributing to the establishment of similar societies in France (1985), Belgium (1989), Italy (1989), the United Kingdom (1991), Croatia (1997), the Netherlands (1999), Germany (2000), South Korea (2005) and Russia (2011).

The Society for Music Theory offers several annual awards that recognize recent publications of outstanding merit in the field of music theory. In 1986, the society began awarding a "Young Scholar" award to scholars under the age of 40 or within 5 years of receipt of their PhD degree, as well as an "Outstanding Publication" award given to distinguished research by a scholar of any age. In 1991, after the death of prominent scholar Wallace Berry, who was a founding officer and former president of the SMT (1982-1985), an award was named in his honor to recognize a distinguished book by any scholar, after which the "Outstanding Publication" award was only given for journal articles. In 1999, the "Young Scholar" award was re-titled the "Emerging Scholar" award. The society also occasionally presents a "Citation of Special Merit" for reference works, translations, edited volumes, or scholarly editions of music scores that are deemed to be of extraordinary value to the discipline.

References

External links
 

Organizations established in 1977
Music-related professional associations
Academic organizations based in the United States
Member organizations of the American Council of Learned Societies
Music theory
1977 establishments in the United States
Music organizations based in the United States